The 1993 Wales rugby union tour of Zimbabwe and Namibia was a series of matches played in May and June 1993 in Zimbabwe and Namibia by Wales national rugby union team. The team was very experimental, as some of the best Welsh players were involved in the Lions tour to New Zealand.

Results 
Scores and results list Wales' points tally first.

1993
1993
1993
1993 rugby union tours
1992–93 in Welsh rugby union
1993 in African rugby union
rugby union
rugby union